James Patrick Robertson Jr. (born April 18, 1986 in Savannah, Georgia) is an American soccer player who most recently played for Atlanta Silverbacks in the North American Soccer League.

Career

College and Amateur
Robertson grew up in Houston, Texas, attended The Woodlands High School, and played for state and regional ODP teams in Texas, before going on to play four years of college soccer at Coastal Carolina University. He scored nine goals and added three assists during his college career, helping the Chanticleers to two Big South Conference championships, and earning Second Team All-Conference honors his junior season.

During his college years Robertson also played with the Chicago Fire Premier in the USL Premier Development League.

Professional
Robertson turned professional in 2008 when he signed with the Harrisburg City Islanders of the USL Second Division. After a brief stint in Peru playing for Juan Aurich and training with Peruvian First Division side Sport Boys, Robertson signed with Bayamón FC of the Puerto Rico Soccer League, who he helped to the PRSL title.

He transferred to the Puerto Rico Islanders for their campaign in the 2010 PRSL season, before moving to the  Atlanta Silverbacks in the North American Soccer League in early 2011. He made his debut for his new team on April 9, 2011 in a game against the NSC Minnesota Stars Atlanta announced on November 8, 2011 that Robertson would return for the 2012 season.

References

External links
Atlanta Silverbacks bio

1986 births
Living people
American soccer players
Atlanta Silverbacks players
Chicago Fire U-23 players
Penn FC players
Puerto Rico Islanders players
USL League Two players
USL Second Division players
North American Soccer League players
Coastal Carolina Chanticleers men's soccer players
Sportspeople from Savannah, Georgia
Soccer players from Georgia (U.S. state)
Association football defenders